The sixth season of Bachelor in Paradise premiered on August 5, 2019. Chris Harrison reprises his role from The Bachelor and The Bachelorette as the host of the show.

Production
As with the previous season, filming took place in the town of Sayulita, located in Vallarta-Nayarit, Mexico.

Casting
On June 17, 2019, Tayshia Adams, Cam Ayala, Demi Burnett, Clay Harbor, Blake Horstmann, John Paul Jones, and Bibiana Julian were revealed as the first seven contestants of Bachelor in Paradise on Good Morning America. Later that day during the premiere of Grand Hotel, former Bachelorette Hannah Brown revealed the rest of the original cast.

On July 2, 2019, Wells Adams was confirmed to be returning as the bartender.

In the episode aired on August 20, 2019, Kristian Haggerty joined the cast, becoming the second Bachelor in Paradise contestant to not have appeared on either The Bachelor or The Bachelorette and first who was not a relative of another cast member. Haggerty was in a relationship with Burnett prior to filming, and was brought onto the show after Burnett expressed her confusion regarding her having feelings for both Haggerty and contestant Derek Peth. To accommodate for Haggerty appearing on the show with Burnett, Burnett was allowed to give out a rose during the men's week while Haggerty gave out her roses during the women's week, as they were the first same-sex relationship to be featured on the American version of the franchise.

Contestants

Elimination table

Key
 The contestant is male.
 The contestant is female.
 The contestant went on a date and gave out a rose at the rose ceremony.
 The contestant went on a date and got a rose at the rose ceremony.
 The contestant gave or received a rose at the rose ceremony, thus remaining in the competition.
 The contestant received the last rose.
 The contestant went on a date and received the last rose.
 The contestant went on a date and was eliminated.
 The contestant was eliminated.
 The contestant went on a date and was eliminated by production from the show due to physical violence at the cocktail party.
 The contestant had a date and voluntarily left the show.
 The contestant had a date, gave out a rose at the rose ceremony and voluntarily left the show.
 The contestant voluntarily left the show.
 The couple broke up and were eliminated.
 The couple decided to stay together and won the competition.
 The contestant had to wait before appearing in paradise.
 The couple split, but later got back together.
 The couple left together to pursue a relationship.

Episodes

References

External links
 
 Information about Riviera Nayarit

Paradise 05
2019 American television seasons
Television shows set in Mexico